Denmark participated in the Eurovision Song Contest 2006 with the song "Twist of Love" written by Niels Drevsholt. The song was performed by Sidsel Ben Semmane. The Danish broadcaster DR organised the national final Dansk Melodi Grand Prix 2006 in order to select the Danish entry for the 2006 contest in Athens, Greece. Ten songs competed in a televised show where "Twist of Love" performed by Sidsel Ben Semmane was the winner as decided upon through two rounds of public voting.

As one of the ten highest placed finishers in 2005, Denmark automatically qualified to compete in the final of the Eurovision Song Contest. Performing during the show in position 9, Denmark placed eighteenth out of the 24 participating countries with 26 points.

Background 

Prior to the 2006 contest, Denmark had participated in the Eurovision Song Contest thirty-four times since its first entry in 1957. In the 2005 contest, "Talking to You" performed by Jakob Sveistrup qualified Denmark to the final placing ninth.

The Danish national broadcaster, DR, broadcasts the event within Denmark and organises the selection process for the nation's entry. DR confirmed their intentions to participate at the 2006 Eurovision Song Contest on 17 June 2005. Denmark has selected all of their Eurovision entries through the national final Dansk Melodi Grand Prix. Along with their participation confirmation, the broadcaster announced that Dansk Melodi Grand Prix 2006 would be organised in order to select Denmark's entry for the 2006 contest.

Before Eurovision

Dansk Melodi Grand Prix 2006 
Dansk Melodi Grand Prix 2006 was the 36th edition of Dansk Melodi Grand Prix, the music competition that selects Denmark's entries for the Eurovision Song Contest. The event was held on 11 February 2006 at the Gigantium in Aalborg, hosted by Adam Duvå Hall and Mads Vangsø with Græker-Kaj hosting segments from the green room. The show was televised on DR1 as well as streamed online at the official DR website. The national final was watched by 1.651 million viewers in Denmark.

Competing entries 
DR opened a submission period between 17 June 2005 and 10 October 2005 for composers to submit their entries. All composers and lyricists were required to be Danish citizens or have been registered as a Danish resident from 1 July 2005 to 20 May 2006. The broadcaster received 336 entries during the submission period. A selection committee selected ten songs from the entries submitted to the broadcaster, while the artists of the selected entries were chosen by DR in consultation with their composers. DR held a press meet and greet at the DR Byen in Copenhagen on 8 December 2005 where the competing artists and songs were announced and officially presented. Among the artists were Helge Engelbrecht (member of Neighbours) who represented Denmark in the Eurovision Song Contest 1987 as part of Bandjo, Trine Jepsen who represented Denmark in the Eurovision Song Contest 1999, and Søren Poppe who represented Denmark in the Eurovision Song Contest 2001 as part of Rollo and King.

Final 
The final took place on 11 February 2006 where the winner was determined over two rounds of public voting. The running order was determined by DR and announced on 6 January 2006. In the first round of voting the top five advanced to the superfinal. In the superfinal, the winner, "Twist of Love" performed by Sidsel Ben Semmane, was selected. Viewers were able to vote via telephone or SMS and the voting results of each of Denmark's four regions in the superfinal were converted to points which were distributed as follows: 4, 6, 8, 10 and 12 points.

At Eurovision
According to Eurovision rules, all nations with the exceptions of the host country, the "Big Four" (France, Germany, Spain and the United Kingdom) and the ten highest placed finishers in the 2005 contest are required to qualify from the semi-final in order to compete for the final; the top ten countries from the semi-final progress to the final. As one of the ten highest placed finishers in the 2005 contest, Denmark automatically qualified to compete in the final on 20 May 2006. On 21 March 2006, a special allocation draw was held which determined the running order and Denmark was set to perform in position 9, following the entry from Germany and before the entry from Russia. Denmark placed eighteenth in the final, scoring 26 points.

The semi-final and final were broadcast on DR1 with commentary by Mads Vangsø and Adam Duvå Hall. The Danish spokesperson, who announced the Danish votes during the final, was Jørgen de Mylius. The final of the contest was watched by a total of 1.7 million viewers in Denmark.

Voting 
Below is a breakdown of points awarded to Denmark and awarded by Denmark in the semi-final and grand final of the contest. The nation awarded its 12 points to Sweden in the semi-final and to Finland in the final of the contest.

Points awarded to Denmark

Points awarded by Denmark

References

2006
Countries in the Eurovision Song Contest 2006
Eurovision
Eurovision